Historical Medieval Battles (HMB) or Buhurt (from Old French béhourd: "wallop") or Armored Combat  is a modern full contact fighting sport with steel blunt weapons characteristic for the Middle Ages. Armour and weapons have to follow regulations on historical authenticity and safety published on official Battle of the Nations website.

Fighters are covered in full modern produced protective armour, made from steel (or other metal alloy if permitted) made to aesthetically be as close to their historical counterparts as possible. This in contrast to Historical European Martial Arts (HEMA) that uses modern protective equipment such as a modern fencing helmet, padded fencing jacket, modern padded/heavy duty fencing gloves, forearm and leg protection.

Hits and blows may be aimed at any parts of the body (with the limitations set in the regulations); both wrestling and percussive techniques are permitted.

Unlike staged battles, that can be seen at festivals of historical reenactment of the Middle Ages the competitions in buhurt are the full contact sporting events that are refereed by the referees called knight marshals who have special training and combat experience.

History
Historical medieval battles dates back to the first large-scale battles with the use of steel arms, which were held in Russia, Belarus and Ukraine  in the late 1990s and the beginning of the 21st century, at times when in the rest of the Eastern European countries reenactors used wooden or textolite weapons. An example is the festival "Zhelezny Grad" (Iron Town) held in Izborsk, where buhurts involving hundreds of fighters took place or Sword of Russia tournament from 1996.  

The first European Championship took place in Ukraine in 2005, with nominations "Sword and Shield", and "Sword vs Sword". 

The expansion of buhurt as a sport truly began after the first held Battle of the Nations in Khotyn Fortress in Ukraine where participants from Ukraine, Poland, Belarus and Russia competed under unified rules and regulations. This event attracted participants from the rest of Europe and outside of it and buhurt gained worldwide attention from reenactment community. There is a growing interest in buhurt in the United States. One such organization, Armored Combat League (which split in 2019, creating Armored Combat Worldwide and Armored Combat Sports) was featured in a series called Knight Fight on History Channel. 

Battle of the Nations is held every other year at a new fortress or castle.

Competitive categories
Historical medieval battle, like any other sport, has several categories. All its categories can be divided into mass and singles.

Single categories
Single categories, namely "one vs one" are divided into tournaments and professional fights.

Tournaments
Points / hits are counted in tournaments known as duels; a fighter must deliver a certain number of blows, commonly 10, to his opponent or gain the maximum number of points within a certain period of time. The tournaments are divided into:

 "Shield-sword" fighters compete with each other, using a shield and sword
 "Sword-sword" each fighter has a one-handed sword and no shield
 "Sword – buckler" fighters use a swords and buckler, first fighter to 5 hits wins.
 "Longsword" fighters use longswords
 "Nonstandard" weapons that do not fit the first two categories: halberd, two-handed ax, two-handed swords, etc. are used for fighting.

There is also a category called "Triathlon": three rounds with different weapons, the first one – "longsword", the second one – "sword-buckler", the third one – "shield-sword."

Professional fights
The second "single" HMB category is professional fights. A fight is held in the format of "three rounds of three minutes." According to the rules, any techniques aimed at delivering blows to any part of the body, except for the neck, back of the knee, groin, eyes, feet, and back of the head, if an opponent is bent, are allowed except for thrusts, which are prohibited in all HMB categories. All other things, including 3-second ground fighting with no active movements of the opponents are allowed.

Mass categories
 "5 vs 5"
 "10 vs 10"
 "12 vs 12"
 "16 vs 16"
 "30 vs 30"
 Buhurts

The rules of mass battles are slightly different. The “kill zones” are the same, but the winner is the one who remains standing on his feet, hits are not counted.

In addition to these categories, there are some others, such as the "2 vs 2" which are held in the “deathmatch” mode: several two-member units meet on the lists, the battle is "all against all" and the winner is the two-member unit, of which at least one fighter is on his feet; "10 vs 10" and others. HMB categories often can be created for a specific festival, depending on its objectives and specific requirements of historicity.

Training and preparation of fighters
Workouts are held in accordance with the most effective modern methods of training available in the martial arts. HMB fighters practice weight lifting, related martial arts, and cardiovascular workouts. Fighters often use groundwork of other contact martial arts in their training practices.

Regulations
There are unified international rules for the battles. They prohibit a number of very traumatic techniques, as well as regulate the admission of fighters and their weapons in order to observe the historical reliability of equipment, and also to eliminate serious injuries. Due to the fact that different countries used to have different fighting rules, the first unified rules were developed specifically for the world championship on historical medieval battle, "Battle of the Nations." However, the rules used at a local tournament may still differ, for example it may be prohibited to deliver blows to certain areas such as below the knee, or elbow, but the international rating events are conducted in accordance with the accepted international rules for historical medieval battles. Weapons are checked for correct measurements and safety before fighters enter the list.

See also
 Historical European martial arts

References

Medieval reenactment
Military reenactment
Battles